George Buhr (July 28, 1918 – July 24, 2005) was an American football and basketball coach.  He was the head football coach at Bethel College in North Newton, Kansas, serving for one season, in 1957, and compiling a record of 5–4.

Head coaching record

Football

References

External links
 

1918 births
2005 deaths
Basketball coaches from Minnesota
Bethel Threshers athletic directors
Bethel Threshers football coaches
Bethel Threshers men's basketball coaches
Bethel College (Kansas) alumni
People from Mountain Lake, Minnesota
American Mennonites